John Brodie Williams (July 16, 1889 – September 8, 1963) was a Major League Baseball pitcher. He pitched in four games for the Detroit Tigers in 1914, including three starts. He pitched 11 innings, giving up 17 hits and 12 runs. Williams, known as "Honolulu Johnny", was the first player of Hawaiian ancestry to play in the major leagues.

Notes

Sources

Major League Baseball pitchers
Detroit Tigers players
Sacramento Sacts players
Mission Wolves players
Los Angeles Angels (minor league) players
Salt Lake City Bees players
St. Joseph Drummers players
Baseball players from Hawaii
1889 births
1963 deaths